This entry describes a film. For information on the geographic feature 'coastline', please see coast.

The Coastline is a film by Peter Greenaway, made in 1983. It is also known as The Sea in Their Blood, and exhibited at the National Maritime Museum, Greenwich, London, as Beside the Sea. It is a mockumentary or "artificial documentary", featuring images of the British seaside and voiceovers of endless unsubstantiated statistics. For example:
"Most fish is eaten in Britain fried in batter and breadcrumbs. 10 percent is boiled, 5 percent grilled, 3 percent is steamed. Very little is eaten raw except by cats and in Japanese restaurants, 29 in London and 1 in Milton Keynes."

Sources
http://petergreenaway.co.uk/sea.htm
Produced by Annabel Olivier Wright

External links

 Peter Greenaway's official site
 Summary of film

1983 films
Films directed by Peter Greenaway
British mockumentary films
1980s English-language films
1980s British films